Lee Samuel Finn  is an American astrophysicist, former Professor of Physics, Astronomy and Astrophysics and 
former Director of the Center for Gravitational Wave Physics at Pennsylvania State University. His research interests are in gravitational wave astronomy.

He is a Fellow of the American Physical Society (2002)
, a member of the American Astronomical Society, the Association for Computing Machinery, and the Society for Industrial and Applied Mathematics.

Lee Samuel Finn was the founding Field Chief Editor of the peer-reviewed journal Frontiers in Astronomy and Space Sciences, and Specialty Chief Editor for its Cosmology section, in which roles he served from the journal's founding until mid-2018.

According to NASA ADS, as of November 2014 his h index is 55, with 3492 refereed citations; his tori index is 33.5, and the riq index is 193.

Notes

External links
personal webapge at the Pennsylvania State University
personal webpage at the gravitational wave astronomy group
Finn group homepage

Year of birth missing (living people)
Living people
American astronomers
21st-century American physicists
Fellows of the American Physical Society